Officine Meccaniche or OM was an Italian car and truck manufacturing company. It was founded in 1899 in Milan as Società Anonima Officine Meccaniche to manufacture railway rolling stock and car production began in 1918. It disappeared as such in 1975, subsumed into Iveco, but still exists as a forklift builder.

Origins
The inception of the company resulted from the merger of two companies, Grondona Comi & C and Miani Silvestri & C in 1899. Originally, OM manufactured railway stock. Car production started in 1918, using the plant of the former Brixia-Zust (Brixia-Züst), just after OM took over Zust car company of Brescia, Northern Italy. The first OM car, Tipo S305, primarily an old Zust model, appeared in 1918 with a  four-cylinder side-valve in-line engine.

The OM cars era
Further models were Tipo 465 (with a  four) in 1919, Tipo 467 and Tipo 469 in 1921. 1923 saw an all new model, Tipo 665 'Superba' with a  six-cylinder engine. Some cars were equipped with Roots superchargers.

In 1925 OM began to build trucks and buses, using licensed Swiss Saurer engines and other mechanical components. Ties with Saurer persisted through all of OM's history.

Fiat take-over and post-war years
OM was taken over by the Fiat Group in 1938 and in the following year passenger car production ceased, and OM became a commercial vehicle and train part manufacturer.

Main new product in the WWII post-war era was the Leoncino (1950) a light truck in the  range, which was an immediate success. It became the forefather of several series of heavier but structurally similar models, namely Tigrotto, Tigre, Lupetto, Cerbiatto and Daino, launched between 1957 and 1964. Bus chassis versions of several of these models were also available.

In the 60s and 70s the light and medium-weight OM truck ranges were sold in Switzerland as Saurer-OM or Berna-OM, in Austria as Steyr-OM, in France as Unic-OM, and in Germany as Büssing-OM.

The end of OM
In 1968 OM was definitively merged into the Fiat Group as a brand belonging to the Commercial Vehicles division, which also included Fiat and Unic.

In 1975 it was absorbed (as part of the Fiat Group) into IVECO and the OM brand disappeared from the truck and bus markets, although it still survives as an independent forklift manufacturer.

Products
 FS ALn 772
 OM X-series

See also

List of Italian companies
 1925 24 Hours of Le Mans
 1926 24 Hours of Le Mans
 Tripoli Grand Prix

External links
 OM forklifts webpage

 
Defunct motor vehicle manufacturers of Italy
Iveco
Vehicle manufacturing companies established in 1918
Italian companies established in 1918
Milan motor companies
Defunct rolling stock manufacturers of Italy
Forklift truck manufacturers
Defunct truck manufacturers
Vehicle manufacturing companies disestablished in 1975
1975 disestablishments in Italy
Sports car manufacturers
Italian racecar constructors